A kit car is an automobile available as a set of parts that a manufacturer sells and the buyer then assembles into a functioning car. Usually, many of the major mechanical systems such as the engine and transmission are sourced from donor vehicles or purchased new from other vendors. Kits vary in completeness, consisting of as little as a book of plans, or as much as a complete set with all components to assemble into a fully operational vehicle such as those from Caterham.

Related terms
There is also a sub-set of the kit car, commonly referred to as a "re-body", in which a commercially manufactured vehicle has a new (often fiberglass) body put on the running chassis.  Most times, the existing drive gear and interior are retained.  These kits require less technical knowledge from the builder, and because the chassis and mechanical systems were designed, built, and tested by a major automotive manufacturer, a re-body can lead to a much higher degree of safety and reliability.

The definition of a kit car usually indicates that a manufacturer constructs multiple kits of the same vehicle, each of which it then sells to a third party to build. A kit car should not be confused with 
a hand built car or special car, which is typically modified or built from scratch by an individual for a specific purpose (e.g. Hillclimbing, road or circuit racing, (e.g. the Halford Special) or record attempts (cf. Railton Special)). Note, however, that rally specials (and more obviously 'Homologation specials') have, especially since World War 2, usually referred to manufacturers' specially series-produced cars.
a component car which is a self-assembly car in which 100% of the parts required to build the car are purchased from a single company. Component Cars are distinguished from kit cars as all parts are quality controlled and designed to fit together perfectly.  They can be built in significantly less time than a "kit car". See also Knock-down kit, a term usually applied to a similar but larger commercial exercise.

History

Kit cars have been around from the earliest days of the automobile. In 1896 the Englishman Thomas Hyler-White developed a design for a car that could be assembled at home and technical designs were published in a magazine called The English Mechanic. In the US, the Lad's Car of 1912 could be bought for $160 ($3000 US in 2006) fully assembled or $140 ($2600 US in 2006) in kit form.

It was not until the 1950s that the idea really took off. Car production had increased considerably and with rust proofing in its infancy, many older vehicles were being sent to breaker yards as their bodywork was beyond economic repair. An industry grew up supplying new bodies and chassis to take the components from these cars and convert them into new vehicles, particularly into sports cars. Fiber reinforced plastic (aka "GRP," or "fiberglass") was coming into general use and made limited-scale production of automobile body components much more economical.  Also, in the UK up to the mid-1970s, kit cars were sometimes normal production vehicles that were partially assembled as this avoided the imposition of purchase tax as the kits were assessed as components and not vehicles.

During the 1970s, many kits had bodies styled as sports cars that were designed to bolt directly to VW Beetle chassis. This was popular as the old body could be easily separated from the chassis leaving virtually all mechanical components attached to the chassis and a GRP-body from the kit supplier shop fitted. This made the Beetle one of the most popular "donor" vehicles of all time. Examples of this conversion include the Bradley GT, Sterling, and Sebring which were made by the thousands, and many are still around today.  Volkswagen based dune buggies also appeared in relatively large numbers in the 1960s and 1970s based usually on a shortened floor pan.

Current kit cars are frequently replicas of well-known and often expensive classics and are designed so that anyone with a measure of technical skill can build them at home to a standard where they can be driven on the public roads. These replicas are in general appearance like the original, but their bodies are often made of fiberglass mats soaked in polyester resin instead of the original sheet metal. Replicas of the AC Cobra and the Lotus 7 are particularly popular examples, the right to manufacture the Lotus 7 now being owned by Caterham Cars who bought the rights to the car from Lotus founder Colin Chapman in 1973. Caterham Cars are a "Component Car" and are a continued development of Chapman's design, whereas all other Lotus 7 style cars are replicas, and are "Kit Cars" costing significantly less and not having the residual values of the Caterham.  These Replica kit cars enable enthusiasts to possess a vehicle similar in appearance to a vehicle which because of scarcity they may not be able to afford, and at the same time take advantage of modern technology. The Sterling Nova Kit originally produced in the UK was the most popular VW based Kits being produced worldwide and licensed under several different names with an estimated 10000 sold.

Many people react skeptically when they first hear about kit cars as it appears to them to be technically impossible to assemble a car at home and license it for public roads. They may also be worried that such a car would not subsequently pass the mandatory quality control (road worthiness test) that is required in most countries. For example, to obtain permission to use a kit car in Germany, every such vehicle with a speed over 6 km/h without a general operating license (ABE) or an EC type permission (EC-TG) has to undergo, as per the § 21 of Road traffic licensing regulations (STVZO), a technical inspection by an officially recognized expert of a Technical Inspection Authority. In the United Kingdom it is necessary to meet the requirements of the IVA (Individual vehicle Approval) regulations. In the United States SEMA has gone state by state to set up legal ways for states to register kit cars and speciality vehicles for inspection and plates.

A survey of nearly 600 kit car owners in the US, the UK and Germany, carried out by Dr. Ingo Stüben, showed that typically 100–1,500 hours are required to build a kit car, depending upon the model and the completeness of the kit. However, as the complexity of the kits offered continues to increase, build times have increased as well some running to 5000 hours plus for accurate replica kits.

Several sports car producers such as  Lotus, Marcos, and TVR started as kit car makers.

Kit car manufacturers

Argentina
 Pur Sang

Australia

 Alpha Sports
 Bolwell
 Pellandini Cars
 PRB
 Purvis Eureka
 Elfin Sports Cars
 Bushrangie
 J&S Hunter Coupe
 amaroo cars

Austria
 Custoca

Belgium
 Apal

Estonia
 ESTfield
 Rexer

Germany
 Apal
 Fiberfab
 Michalak Design
 Hoffmann 2CV

Hong Kong
 Automobile Addiction Company Limited – cars based on Ferrari 250's

Italy
 ATS Automobile Turismo Sport – sports cars

Mexico
 Unidiseño Mastretta

Netherlands
 Burton
Le Patron

New Zealand

New Zealand had a long history of small garages and vehicle enthusiasts modifying and creating sports and sports racing cars. In the early 1950s, with the advent of fibreglass bodied cars, a new opportunity arose for local companies associated with car enthusiasts to create car bodies. Among these early manufacturers was Weltex Plastics Limited of Christchurch, which imported a Microplas Mistral sports car mould and began making bodies and chassis in 1956. They were followed in 1958 by Frank Cantwell's Puma and Bruce Goldwater's Cougar. Also in New Zealand during this period, Ferris de Joux was constructing a variety of sports racers. De Joux is noted in particular for his Mini GT from the 1960s.

Ross Baker's Heron Cars started in 1962 making racing cars and eventually began producing kit cars in 1980. Bill Ashton, formerly of Microplas and Weltex, joined with Ted George in the 1960s and made the Tiki. Three were known to have been made. Graham McRae with Steve Bond of Gemini Plastics imported a replica Le Mans M6B styled GT mould in 1968, The cars were made and sold by Dave Harrod and Steve Bond of Fibreglass Developments Ltd, Bunnythorpe as the Maram. McRae went on to make a Porsche Spyder replica in the 1990s.

A number of new companies entered the market in the 1980s – Almac 1985, Alternative Cars (1984), Cheetah (1986), Chevron (1984), Countess Mouldings (1988), Fraser (1988), Leitch (1986), and Saker (1989). Some recent ones are Baettie (1997), which became Redline in 2001 and moved to the United Kingdom in 2007 as Beattie Racing Limited, and McGregor (2001).

Two companies who specialise in making replicas of various models to order are Classic Car Developments (1992) and Tempero.

Slovakia
 K1-Attack

K1-Attack Kit car produced by Slovakian company K1 Styling & Tuning. Their cars are customizable, and comes in many different variations since 2001. K1 offers engines produced by Honda, Toyota, etc. in 130HP to 800HP range. Due to its light weight it achieves same power output/weight ratio as Lamborghini Gallardo, Audi R8, or Ferrari F430 even with 280 hp engine.

Subframe costs around $10,000.

(Cheapest) Complete kit costs around $15,000, and it is based on Honda Accord 4/5G F20/F22 (2.0L-2.2L) engine.

Complete kit with Honda Civic Type-R 9-10G K20C1 is priced at $23,000 and achieves 320HP (at request, engine can be tuned to 400-500HP).

Many more engines, such as Honda K24, Toyota 3SGTE are available.

Customers also did successful projects, using engines such as VW 1.9 TDI, VW 1.8T, (not specified) 2.0 Subaru engine, 2.5L V6 Ford, 3.0 V6 Jaguar, 3.0 I6 BMW, or 4.2L V8 from Audi R8.

Even though K1 Styling & Tuning is based originally in Slovakia, they proudly present as company producing Czecho-Slovakian products.

South Africa
 Birkin Cars

Sweden

Technically, kit cars are not allowed in Sweden, but provided that most of the components and material are sourced by the builder personally it is possible to register them as amateur built vehicles. Before the law requiring a mandatory crash test in 1970 there was a booming kit car industry in Sweden with most companies basing their kits on the VW Beetle chassis. By the time amateur built vehicles were once again allowed in 1982, all kit car makers in Sweden were out of business.

The inspection (SVA equivalent) in Sweden is handled by the car builder's association SFRO who makes two inspections; one when the car has reached the rolling chassis stage and the second when the car is finished.

 Boes Motor & Mekanik
 Esther
 Hult Healey
 Mania Spyder
 Mascot
 Ockelbo
 Pagano
 Racing Plast Burträsk (RPB)
 Roadline, Porsche Speedster and Porsche Boxer RS replicas

United Kingdom

Vehicle regulations in the UK allow the production of up to 200 vehicles a year without the extensive regulation and testing requirements applied to mass-market vehicles. This has led to an expanding industry of small producers capable of offering partial and complete kits, some for export, and finished vehicles for domestic use.

The DVLA regulate kit cars in the UK, which helps to ensure that vehicles used on the road are safe and suitable for the purpose.  The current test for this is Individual Vehicle Approval (IVA), which has replaced Single Vehicle Approval (SVA).  When SVA was first introduced in 1998, many believed this would kill off the kit car market, but in reality it has made the kit car market stronger, as the vehicles produced now have to meet a minimum standard.  IVA was introduced in summer 2009 and it is too early to tell what impact this will have on the industry.

People not involved in the UK kit car scene may believe all kit cars are given a 'Q' registration plate which signifies a vehicle of unknown or mixed age, where in fact a significant number (majority?) do not.  All kit cars are subject to a Vehicle Identity Check, VIC, by the DVLA to determine the registration mark a kit car is assigned.  This will be either, a new, current year, registration; an 'age-related' registration; or a 'Q' plate.  Once a kit car has been correctly registered, a V5C, or log book, will be assigned and then a kit car is treated in exactly the same way as a production car, from any larger manufacturer.  A kit car must pass its MOT test and have a valid car tax, or have a valid Statutory Off-Road Notification (SORN) declaration. As part of the IVA, a kit car can sometimes be permitted to assume the age of a single, older car (the donor car) if the major parts were taken from it in its construction. If the age identifier assigned to a kit car falls before 1980 the vehicle may be road taxed free of charge.

According to figures given to Kit Car magazine, the most popular kit in the United Kingdom in 2005 was made by Robin Hood Sportscars, who sold 700 kits a year. The Editor of Kit Car Magazine suggests in 2016 the MEV Exocet was the best selling kit car.

 356 Sports
 3GE Components
 AK Sportscars
 Alternative Cars Limited (UK)
 Arkley SS
 AS Motorsport Limited – replica Aston Martin DBR1 and DBR2's
 Ashley Laminates
 ADD Nova
 Autotune (Rishton) Limited – replica XK120, Elva, and McLaren
 Banham Conversions
 Beauford automobiles
 Brightwheel Replicas Ltd – Replica Cobra and Countach
 Buckler Cars
 Burlington Cars
 Cavallo
 Clan
  Classic Replicas – carry on company after Brightwheel -Cobra Replicas.
 Covin
 Dakar 4x4
 Dax
 Davrian
 Diva
 Dutton Cars
 Eagle (SS)
 Elva
 Embeesea Kit Cars
 Fairthorpe Cars
 Falcon Shells
 Gardner Douglas
 GCS Hawke
 Gentry Cars
 Ginetta Cars
 GKD sports cars
 Great British Sports Cars
 GTM Cars
 Hawk Cars
 Heron Plastics
 Hustler
 Jago
 JBA Cars
 JZR Trikes
 Locost
 Locust
 Lomax
 Marcos
 Mills Extreme Vehicles
 McCoy
 Marlin
 Microplas
 Midas Cars
 MK Sportscars
 MNR Sportscars
 Onyx Sports Cars
 Opperman
 Parallel Designs
 Peel
 Peerless / Warwick
 Piper Cars
 Pembleton
 Quantum Sports Cars
 Raw
 RTR
 Robin Hood
 Rochdale
 Scamp
 Sherpley Motors
 Siva
 Sylva
 Spartan Cars
 Tiger Racing
 Tornado
 Trident
 Turner Sports Cars
 Ultima Sports
 Vindicator Cars
 Westfield Sportscars

Manufacturers in the UK are actively supported by Owners Clubs, some of which are marque specific; while others follow a specific type, such as Cobra replicas. Some groups are also area related, (for example, by county or geographic location).

 Quantum Owners Club
 Southern Kit Car Club

United States

A glider kit is a term used in the United States for a kit of components used to restore or reconstruct a wrecked or dismantled vehicle. Glider kits include a chassis (frame), front axle, and body (cab). The kit may also contain other optional components. A motor vehicle constructed from a glider kit is titled as a new vehicle.

More common terms include "partial-turnkey," "turnkey-minus," and (though it technically refers to a vehicle without a body, rather than body without drivetrain) "rolling chassis," or "roller."

Examples of US kit manufacturers and cars include:

 Blakely Auto Works
 Bradley Automotive
 Classic Motor Carriages (CMC)
 DDR Motorsport
 Devin Enterprises
 DF Kit Car – Manufacturer of the DF Goblin kit car
 Factory Five Racing – Manufacturer of Cobra replicas as well as the GTM Supercar, and 818 of their own design
 Race-car-replicas – Manufacturers of GT40 (MKI and MKII), Lola T70, Jaguar D-Type and XJ-13, P4, 917 and 962 and others.
 Fiberfab
 Kelmark Engineering
 Sterling Sports Cars – Car from the USA also known as the Nova in the UK
 La Dawri
 Lad's Car
 McBurnie Coachcraft
 Meyers Manx
 Pangra – Turbocharging, water-injection and body rework of the Ford Pinto
 Street Beasts
 Velo Rossa Spyder and Coupe (resembles Ferrari 250 GTO) by Reaction Research
 San Diego Replicas – Manufacturer of Speedster and Spyder kit cars and full turnkey replicas.
 Brunton Automotive – V6 Roadster originally based on the Chevy S10
 SSZ Motorcars
 Superformance
 Vaydor

See also
 Manufacturer's Certificate of Origin
 Knock-down kit

Notes